Ynyshir railway station served the village of Ynyshir, in the Rhondda Fach valley in south Wales, from 1876 to 1964.

History
The station was opened by the Taff Vale Railway (TVR) in 1885, on its Maerdy Branch, which ran along the Rhondda Fach valley. At a later date, the spelling of the station name was amended to Ynyshir.

The TVR amalgamated with the Great Western Railway (GWR) on 1 January 1922; the GWR in its turn amalgamated with other railways to form British Railways on 1 January 1948.

The station was closed by British Railways on 15 June 1964.

References

External links
Ynyshir Station on navigable O.S. map

Disused railway stations in Rhondda Cynon Taf
Former Taff Vale Railway stations
Railway stations in Great Britain opened in 1885
Railway stations in Great Britain closed in 1964
Beeching closures in Wales